Stand Alone is a 1985  American action drama film directed  by Alan Beattie and starring  Charles Durning.

Plot 
An older war hero witnesses a murder. He is reluctant to identify the killers. When they come after him, he ends up having to protect his family and himself the only way he knows: fight to survive.

Cast 
 
 Charles Durning as   Louis Thibadeau
 Pam Grier as  Cathryn Bolan
 James Keach as  Detective Isgrow
 Bert Remsen as  Paddie
  Barbara Sammeth as  Meg
 Lu Leonard as  Mrs. Whitehead
 Luis Contreras as  Look-Out
 Willard E. Pugh as  Macombers
 Bob Tzudiker as  Farley
  Mary Ann Smith  as  Nurse Warren
  Cory 'Bumper' Yothers  as  Gordie

References

External links 

1985 films
1985 action films
New World Pictures films
1980s English-language films
American action drama films
1980s American films